Fahnestock Glacier is a glacier about  long draining to the Sulzberger Ice Shelf. It was named by the Advisory Committee on Antarctic Names after Mark A. Fahnestock, a faculty member of the University of New Hampshire, who was a field and theoretical researcher in Greenland and in the West Antarctic Ice Stream area from the 1980s onwards.

References 

Glaciers of Marie Byrd Land